Storm Sanders was the defending champion but chose to compete at the 2022 Christus Health Pro Challenge instead.

Kimberly Birrell won the title, defeating Maddison Inglis in the final, 3–6, 7–5, 6–4.

Seeds

Draw

Finals

Top half

Bottom half

References

External Links
Main Draw

City of Playford Tennis International - Singles